Brian J. "Bronk" Brunkhorst (born June 12, 1945) is a retired American basketball player.

Career
Born in Owen, Wisconsin, Brunkhorst played collegiately for the Marquette University. He was selected by the New York Knicks in the 6th round (72nd pick overall) of the 1968 NBA Draft. Eventually, he played for the Los Angeles Stars (1968–69) in the ABA for three games.

External links

1945 births
Living people
American men's basketball players
Basketball players from Wisconsin
Los Angeles Stars draft picks
Los Angeles Stars players
Marquette Golden Eagles men's basketball players
New York Knicks draft picks
People from Clark County, Wisconsin
Forwards (basketball)